The Rugby Football League (RFL) 2021 Championship comprised 22-rounds in the regular season with a four-round play-off post-season contested by the top six clubs to determine which club would be promoted to the 2022 Super League.

Regular season

Round 1

Round 2

Round 3

Round 4

Round 5

Round 6
Limited attendances by home supporters only were allowed from Monday 17 May 2021.

Round 7

Round 8

Round 9

Round 10

Round 11

Round 12

Round 13

Round 14

Round 15

Round 16

Round 17

Round 18

Round 19

Round 20

Round 21

Round 22

Play-offs
Similar to the Super League, the teams who finished first and second respectively on the regular season table (Toulouse Olympique and Featherstone Rovers respectively, had byes to the semi-finals. The four teams who finish third to sixth contested in the two eliminator play-offs, with the winner of those two games moving on to the semi-finals (Halifax Panthers and Batley Bulldogs respectively).

Team bracket

Week 1: Eliminators

Week 2: Semi-finals

Week 3: Million Pound Game

References

RFL Championship results
RFL Championship season results
RFL Championship season results